The Ahmadzai is a Pashtun subtribe of the Ghilji confederacy. Ahmadzai Pashtun tribe is a Powandah tribe and are traditional nomadic merchant warriors. They are considered as the pioneers of trade among other Powandah merchant tribes. The tribe is more prosperous and are greeted with respect. Ahmadzai tribe is the largest tribe among Pashtuns. They follow Pashtunwali rigidly and are known for their Jirgahs. In history Ahmadzai are one of the strongest tribes and had control of power in Afghanistan. Ahmadzai tribe is known for their hospitality and strict code of conduct. There are some rules which no one can break and if they took responsibility they mean it. Currently, they are living in Afghanistan and Pakistan. They have properties in Islamabad and Peshawar. Large number of Ahmadzai have fought against the US invasion of Afghanistan. Traditionally, the Ahmadzai ranged from Logar to Jalalabad, but mostly in Paktia, Paktika, and Khost. A large portion of the tribe live as Kochi nomads.
Sub Tribes of Ghilzai Ahmadzai are Isa Khel, Jabar Khel, Maruf Khel, Musa Khel, Zandak Khel, Ya Khel. There are some other tribes within these sub-tribes.
The former Afghan presidents Ashraf Ghani Ahmadzai (2014–2021) and Mohammad Najibullah Ahmadzai (1987–1992) belonged to the Ahmadzai tribe.

Notable Ahmadzai

Ashraf Ghani Ahmadzai, former President of Afghanistan, 2014-2021
Hashmat Ghani Ahmadzai, Grand Council Chieftain of the Kochi people
Mirwais Ahmadzaï, France-based musician and record producer
Mohammad Najibullah Ahmadzai, President of Afghanistan, 1987–1992
Mohammad Sarwar Ahmedzai, politician, 2014 Afghan presidential candidate
Abdul Haq, Afghan Mujahideen leader
Salar Ahmadzai is an Afghan pilot

References

Ghilji Pashtun tribes